Yerushalmi literally means "something from Jerusalem, in particular,   a person who lives in Jerusalem, a Jerusalemite. It may also refer to:

 Jerusalem Talmud (Talmud Yerushalmi, often Yerushalmi for short)
 Meurav Yerushalmi (Jerusalem Mixed Grill)
Kugel Yerushalmi, a noodle casserole developed by the Ashkenazi community in Jerusalem
 Targum Yerushalmi
 Targum Pseudo-Jonathan (Targum Yerushalmi)
Yerushalmi (surname)

Jerusalem